Robert Atherton (1861–1930) was an English poet. During his lifetime he was referred to as The Ploughman Poet.

Early life
Atherton was the son of Robert  Atherton and Ellen Hesketh. Born in Kirkby, Lancashire in 1861; at the time a small farming village which 
has since developed into a busy suburb of Liverpool.

He spent his youth as a ploughboy but later took holy orders at St Aidan's College, Birkenhead. He allegedly taught himself Hebrew, Latin and Greek.

Career
Atherton became Rector of the parish church at Bolnhurst in Bedfordshire, a post he occupied for 15 years.

During this time he began writing what became an extensive collection of verse which caused some to regard him as the 'Lancashire Burns'. He acquired the nickname Robin O' Bobs  and the reputation of an eccentric and sometimes used the pseudonym of Rupert Upperton.

He left the St Dunstan's Parish Church, 
Bolnhurst; and the Anglican church in 1904, and became a 'wandering poet', living for a time in Birmingham and Manchester, before returning to his native Kirkby to live at Pear Tree Farm, where he resided until his death in 1930. He is buried in the churchyard of St. Chad's, Kirkby parish church. He later described his departure from the church due to middle class hypocrisy. Atherton was perceived by the establishment to be unsuited to a role in the clergy, and eventually, after fifteen years of service to his parish church, was removed from his position in his adopted rural community in rural Bedfordshire.

The library of the Merseyside Maritime Museum has four copies of his poems that refer to the sinking of the RMS Titanic and the RMS Empress of Ireland. Knowsley Archives has preserved an audio recording on SoundCloud of Atherton reciting his poem about the doomed passenger ship, Titanic.

His poetry subject matter, and writings  describe nature, the countryside environment and emigration by sea, of a bygone era. Some of his literary works are perceived by contemporaries to be well crafted, echoing similar themes to fellow poet, Richard Church.

Personal life
He married Ada Annie Banks in Northampton on 6 December 1887. They had two and divorced in 1896.

Deprived of his living and his home provided by the parish, Atherton contested the loss of his position in society. He died in poverty in 1930; with his final years residing in an outbuilding on his grandnephew's farm.

Ancestry
He a direct descendant of Gawain Atherton. His distant Atherton relatives include the American historian Lewis Eldon Atherton, politician, Gibson Atherton; and  Welsh footballer, Bobby Atherton and English footballer, Tommy Atherton.

List of works
 Village Life and Feeling. Songs and poems. Greening & Co., 1901; 2nd edn, 1907 (1st edition published under the pseudonym "Rupert Upperton"; the 2nd edition appeared under his real name)
 The hymn of the Christmas version 
 Poems of Friendship and Sympathy. Ancoats Printing Works, 1914
 When the Robin Sings and other verses. London 1924 (published under the pseudonym "Robin O'Bobs")
 From Plough to Parsonage: My Life's Story. No date, privately printed

Sources
 Swann, John Randall, 1924. Lancashire Authors:  Series of Biographical Sketches. St. Anne's on Sea: Robertson (printer)
 Local History: Kirkby - photograph
Public Libraries: titles of poems

References

1861 births
1930 deaths
19th-century English Anglican priests
Poets from Liverpool
English male poets